Pseudopontixanthobacter confluentis is a Gram-negative, aerobic and non-motile bacterium from the genus Pseudopontixanthobacter which has been isolated from the Yellow Sea in Korea.

References

External links
Type strain of Altererythrobacter confluentis at BacDive -  the Bacterial Diversity Metadatabase

Sphingomonadales
Bacteria described in 2016